A Micro DVR is a small form factor digital video recorder (DVR) such as a spy cam, lipstick cam, or helmet cam. It includes both image sensing and recording functions, and also includes either a USB port, a receptacle for a removable storage device, or both.

References

Espionage devices
Digital video recorders